Heracleon was a Gnostic who flourished about AD 175, probably in the south of Italy. He is described by Clement of Alexandria (Strom. 
iv. 9) as the most esteemed (δοκιμώτατος) 
of the school of Valentinus; and, according to Origen (Comm. in S. Joann. 
t. ii. § 8, Opp. t. iv. p. 66), said to have been in personal contact (γνώριμος) 
with Valentinus himself. He is barely mentioned by Irenaeus (ii. 41) and by Tertullian 
(adv. Valent. 4). The common source of Philaster and Pseudo-Tertullian 
(i.e. probably the earlier treatise of Hippolytus) contained 
an article on Heracleon between those on Ptolemaeus and Secundus, and on Marcus 
and Colarbasus.

In his system he appears to have regarded the divine nature as a vast abyss in whose Pleroma were Aeons of different orders and/or degrees, emanations from the source of being. Midway between the supreme God and the material world was the Demiourgos, who created the latter, and under whose jurisdiction the lower, animal soul of man proceeded after death, while his higher, celestial soul returned to the Pleroma whence at first it issued.

He seems to have received the ordinary Christian scriptures; and Origen, who treats him as a notable exegete, has preserved fragments of a commentary by him on the fourth gospel, while Clement of Alexandria quotes from him what appears to be a passage from a commentary on Luke. These writings are remarkable for their intensely mystical and allegorical interpretations of the text.

Life
Neander and Cave have suggested Alexandria 
as the place where Heracleon taught; but Clement's language suggests some distance 
either of time or of place; for he would scarcely have thought it necessary to explain 
that Heracleon was the most in repute of the Valentinians if he were at the time 
the head of a rival school in the same city. Hippolytus makes Heracleon one of the 
Italian school of Valentinians; but the silence of all the authorities makes it 
unlikely that he taught at Rome. It seems, therefore, most likely that he taught 
in one of the cities of S. Italy; or Praedestinatus may be right in making Sicily 
the scene of his inventions about Heracleon.

The date of Heracleon is of interest on account of his use of St. John's Gospel, 
which clearly had attained high authority when he wrote. The mere fact, however, 
that a book was held in equal honour by the Valentinians and the orthodox seems 
to prove that it must have attained its position before the separation of the Valentinians 
from the church; and, if so, it is of less importance to determine the exact date 
of Heracleon. The decade 170–180 may probably be fixed for the centre of his activity. 
This would not be inconsistent with his having been personally instructed by Valentinus, 
who continued to teach as late as 160, and would allow time for Heracleon to have 
gained celebrity before Clement wrote, one of whose references to Heracleon is in 
what was probably one of his earliest works. He had evidently long passed from the 
scene when Origen wrote.

Commentary
The chief interest that now attaches to Heracleon is that he is the earliest 
commentator on the N.T. of whom we have knowledge. Origen, in the still extant portion 
of his commentary on St. John, quotes Heracleon nearly 50 times, usually controverting, 
occasionally accepting his expositions. We thus recover large sections of Heracleon's 
commentary on cc. i. ii. iv. and viii. of St. John. There is reason to think that 
he wrote commentaries on St. Luke also. Clement of Alexandria (Strom. iv. 
(25 Eclog. ex Script.
and so probably from an exposition of these verses.

Martyrdom
The first passage quoted by Clement bears on an accusation brought against some 
of the Gnostic sects, that they taught that it was no sin to avoid martyrdom by 
denying the faith. No exception can be taken to what Heracleon says on this subject.

Exposition

In this exposition every word in the sacred text assumes 
significance; and this characteristic runs equally through the fragments of Heracleon's 
commentary on St. John, whether the words commented on be Jesus's own or only 
those of the Evangelist. Thus he calls attention to the facts that in the statement 
"all things were made by Him," the preposition used is
διά; that Jesus is said to have gone down 
to Capernaum and gone up to Jerusalem; that He found the buyers and sellers
ἐν τῷ ἱερῷ, not
ἐν τῷ ναῷ; that He said salvation is of 
the Jews not in them, and again that Jesus tarried with 
the Samaritans, not in them; notice is taken of the point in Jesus's discourse 
with the woman of Samaria, where He first emphasizes His assertion with "Woman, 
believe Me"; and though Origen occasionally accuses Heracleon of deficient accuracy, 
for instance in taking the prophet as meaning no more than a prophet; 
"in three days" as meaning no more than "on the third day"; yet on the 
whole Heracleon's examination of the words is exceedingly minute. He attempts to 
reconcile differences between the Evangelists, e.g. Jesus's ascription 
to the Baptist of the titles "Elias" and "prophet" with John's own disclaimer of 
these titles. He finds mysteries in the numbers in the narrative—in the 46 years 
which the temple was in building, the 6 husbands of the woman of Samaria (for such 
was his reading), the 2 days Jesus abode with the people of the city, the 7th 
hour at which the nobleman's son was healed.

He thinks it necessary to reconcile 
his own doctrine with that of the sacred writer, even at the cost of some violence 
of interpretation. Thus he declares that the Evangelist's assertion that all things 
were made by the Logos must be understood only of the things of the visible creation, 
his own doctrine being that the higher aeon world was not so made, but that the 
lower creation was made by the Logos through the instrumentality of the Demiurge.

Valentinianism
He strives to find Valentinianism in the Gospel by a method of spiritual interpretation. 
Thus the nobleman (βασιλικός) is the 
Demiurge, a petty prince, his kingdom being limited and temporary, the servants 
are his angels, the son is the man who belongs to the Demiurge. As he finds the
ψυχικοί represented in the nobleman's son, 
so again he finds the πνευματικοί in the woman 
of Samaria. The water of Jacob's well which she rejected is Judaism; the husband 
whom she is to call is no earthly husband, but her spiritual bridegroom from the 
Pleroma; the other husbands with whom she previously had committed fornication represent 
the matter with which the spiritual have been entangled; that she is no longer to 
worship either in "this mountain" or in "Jerusalem" means that she is not, like 
the heathen, to worship the visible creation, the Hyle, or kingdom of the devil, 
nor like the Jews to worship the creator or Demiurge; her watering-pot is her good 
disposition for receiving life from the Saviour.

Heracleon's method is one commonly used by orthodox Fathers, 
especially by Origen. Origen even occasionally 
blames Heracleon for being too easily content with more obvious interpretations. 
Heracleon at first is satisfied to take "whose shoe latchet I am not worthy to loose" 
as meaning no more than "for whom I am not worthy to perform menial offices," and 
he has Origen's approbation when he tries, however unsuccessfully, to investigate 
what the shoe represented. It does not appear that Heracleon used his method of 
interpretation controversially to establish Valentinian doctrine, but, being a Valentinian, 
readily found those doctrines indicated in the passages on which he commented.

The devil
One other of his interpretations deserves mention. The meaning which the Greek 
of
 most naturally conveys is that of the pre-Hieronymian 
translation "You are from the father of the Devil," and so it is generally understood 
by Greek Fathers, though in various ways they escape attributing a father to the 
devil. Hilgenfeld, Volkmar, and DeConick consider that the Evangelist shows that he embraced 
the opinion of the Valentinians and some earlier Gnostic sects that the father of 
the devil was the Demiurge or God of the Jews. But this idea was unknown to Heracleon, 
who here interprets the father of the devil as his essentially evil nature; to which 
Origen objects that if the devil be evil by the necessity of his nature, he ought 
rather to be pitied than blamed.

Redemption
To judge from the fragments we have, Heracleon's bent was rather practical than 
speculative. He says nothing of the Gnostic theories as to stages in the origin 
of the universe; the prologue of St. John does not tempt him into mention of the 
Valentinian Aeonology. In fact he does not use the word aeon in the sense employed 
by other Valentinian writers, but rather where according to their use we should 
expect the word Pleroma; and this last word he uses in a special sense, describing 
the spiritual husband of the Samaritan woman as her Pleroma—that is, the complement 
which supplies what was lacking to perfection. We find in his system only two beings 
unknown to orthodox theology, the Demiurge, and apparently a second Son of Man; 
for on
 he distinguishes a higher Son of Man who sows 
from the Saviour Who reaps. Heracleon gives as great prominence as any orthodox 
writer to Christ and His redeeming work. But all mankind are not alike in a condition 
to profit by His redemption. There is a threefold order of creatures: 
The Hylic or material, formed of the ὕλη, which is the substance of the devil, incapable of immortality.
The psychic or animal belonging to the kingdom of the Demiurge; their ψυχή is naturally mortal, but capable of being clothed with immortality, and it depends on their disposition (θέσις) whether they become sons of God or children of the devil.
The pneumatic or spiritual, who are by nature of the divine essence, though entangled with matter and needing redemption to be delivered from it.
These are the special creation of 
the Logos; they live in Him, and become one with Him. In the second class Heracleon 
seems to have had the Jews specially in mind and to have regarded them with a good 
deal of tenderness. They are the children of Abraham who, if they do not love God, 
at least do not hate Him. Their king, the Demiurge, is represented as not hostile 
to the Supreme, and though shortsighted and ignorant, yet as well disposed to faith 
and ready to implore the Saviour's help for his subjects whom he had not himself 
been able to deliver. When his ignorance is removed, he and his redeemed subjects 
will enjoy immortality in a place raised above the material world.

Besides the passages on which he comments Heracleon refers to 
;
;
,
;
;
,
;
;
.

References

Attribution

Bibliography

 
 .
 Heinrici, Val. Gnosis, 127.
 Neander, Gen. Entwick. 143, and Ch. Hist. ii. 135.
 
 Westcott, N. T. Canon. 299.

External links
EarlyChristianWritings entry on Heracleon

Gnostics
2nd-century Christian theologians